Gutton is a surname. Notable people with the surname include:

André Gutton (1904–2002), French architect
Camille Gutton (1872–1963), French physicist 
Robert Gutton (fl. 1384–1397), English politician and member of the Parliament of England